Heibel is a surname. Notable people with the surname include:

Hermann Heibel (1912–1941), German swimmer
Robert J. Heibel, American intelligence agent and academic